Shemavon (Simon) of Agulis or Shemavon Aguletsi was a Safavid official of Armenian origin, who served during the reign of King (Shah) Suleiman I (1666-1694). 

He functioned as mint master (zarrab-bashi) of the important Erivan mint (the provincial capital of the Erivan Province) under four successive governors; Mohammadqoli Khan, Najafqoli Khan Cherkes, Abbasqoli Khan Qajar, and Safi Khan Lezgi. In 1670, he was appointed mint master of the Safavid capital of Isfahan by Shah Suleiman I.

Shemavon was the brother of Zakaria of Agulis (i.e. Zakaria Aguletsi), a merchant of the Safavid era who is mostly remembered for his journal, an important primary source on the history of the Safavid period. Unlike Zakaria, who stayed Christian, Shemavon was a convert to Islam.

Notes

References

Sources
 
 
 
 

People from the Nakhchivan Autonomous Republic
Persian Armenians
17th-century people of Safavid Iran
Ethnic Armenian Shia Muslims
Armenian former Christians
Converts to Shia Islam from Christianity.